Emanuel Andrei Dat (born 18 January 2001) is a Romanian professional footballer who plays as a left winger.

References

External links
 
 

2001 births
Living people
Romanian footballers
Association football midfielders
Liga I players
Liga II players
CFR Cluj players
CS Mioveni players
CSM Reșița players
FC Dunărea Călărași players
Sportspeople from Oradea